Facundo Silvera may refer to:

 Facundo Silvera (footballer, born 1997), Uruguayan football defender
 Facundo Silvera (footballer, born 2001), Uruguayan football midfielder for Danubio